István Fábián is a Hungarian sprint canoeist who competed in the late 1970s and early 1980s. He won two medals in the K-1 10000 m event at the ICF Canoe Sprint World Championships with a silver in 1977 and a bronze in 1981.

References

Hungarian male canoeists
Living people
Year of birth missing (living people)
ICF Canoe Sprint World Championships medalists in kayak
20th-century Hungarian people